Henry de Lacy, Earl of Lincoln (c. 1251February 1311), Baron of Pontefract, Lord of Bowland, Baron of Halton and hereditary Constable of Chester, was an English nobleman and confidant of King Edward I. He served Edward in Wales, France, and Scotland, both as a soldier and a diplomat. Through his mother he was a great-grandson of Amadeus IV, Count of Savoy. He is the addressee, or joint composer, of a poem (a tenson) by Walter of Bibbesworth about crusading, La pleinte par entre missire Henry de Lacy et sire Wauter de Bybelesworthe pur la croiserie en la terre seinte.

Origins

Henry was the son and heir of Edmund de Lacy, Baron of Pontefract (c. 1230–1258) (eldest son and heir apparent of John de Lacy, Earl of Lincoln (c. 1192–1240) and his wife Margaret de Quincy suo jure Countess of Lincoln (c. 1206–1266)) by his wife Alice of Saluzzo, a Savoyard noblewoman descended from Amadeus IV, Count of Savoy.

Inheritance
Henry's father died in 1258 when he was a young child aged about 7, and he went into wardship, which was re-purchased by his mother, with the help of his grandmother. As his father had predeceased his own mother, suo jure the Countess of Lincoln, Henry became her heir when she died in 1266, when he was aged 15 and still in wardship. As the ward to large and important estates from both his father and more importantly his grandmother, he was educated at the court of King Henry III.

In 1258, he inherited from his father the titles and offices Baron of Pontefract, Baron of Halton and hereditary Constable of Chester and in about 1266 from his paternal grandmother, Margaret de Quincy, he inherited lands and titles including Earl of Lincoln. In 1272, he attained the age of majority (21), was knighted and became the Earl of Lincoln.

Career
He became Chief Councillor to King Edward I, son and successor of Henry III. While the king was engaged in military conflicts with the Scots, Henry was appointed Protector of the Realm. Having taken part in the Conquest of Wales in 1282, Henry was granted the Lordship of Denbigh and built Denbigh Castle. 

In 1296, he went to France with Edmund, Earl of Lancaster ("Edmund Crouchback"), the king's younger brother, on whose death in that year he succeeded as commander of the English forces in Gascony; he returned to England early in 1298. He was at the Battle of Falkirk in 1298 and at the Siege of Carlaverock Castle in 1300, both in Scotland. The Roll of Carlaverock records his coat of arms in verse as: Or, a lion rampant purpure. In November 1300 he was sent on a mission to Rome to complain to the Pope about injury done by the Scots. 

He was present at King Edward's death in July 1307. For a short time he was friendly with the new king Edward II, and with his favourite Piers Gaveston, but quickly changed his loyalties and joined Thomas, 2nd Earl of Lancaster and the baronial party. He was one of the "Ordainers" appointed in 1311 and was Regent of the Kingdom during the king's absence in Scotland in the same year. He transferred Stanlow Abbey, the Cistercian monastery of which his family was patron, to Whalley Abbey.

Marriage and issue
He married twice:
Firstly to Margaret Longespée, daughter of Sir William Longespée the Younger by his wife Maud de Clifford, by whom he had two sons who died young and an only daughter and heiress:
Alice de Lacy, 4th Countess of Lincoln (25 December 1281–1348) who married Thomas, 2nd Earl of Lancaster.
Edmund de Lacy, drowned in a well at Denbigh Castle;
John de Lacy, fell to his death from a parapet at Pontefract Castle.
Secondly he married Joan FitzMartin (died 1322), sister of William II FitzMartin (died 1326), Feudal baron of Barnstaple in Devon, without issue.

Death and burial
He died at Lincoln's Inn, his City of London townhouse, and was buried in nearby St Paul's Cathedral. His grave and monument in the choir were destroyed when the Cathedral was burnt down during the Great Fire of London in 1666. A modern monument in the crypt lists De Lacy among the important graves lost.

Ancestry

Notes and references

1251 births
1311 deaths
13th-century English nobility
14th-century English nobility
3
Henry
Burials at St Paul's Cathedral
Barons of Halton